Senator Hadley may refer to:

Galen Hadley (born 1942), Nebraska State Senate
Jackson Hadley (1815–1867), Wisconsin State Senate
Ozra Amander Hadley (1826–1873), Arkansas State Senate
William F. L. Hadley (1847–1901), Illinois State Senate